 
Eulalia is a feminine given name of Greek origin, Ευλαλια, meaning "well-spoken." It may refer to:

People 
 Saint Eulalia (disambiguation), the name of two venerated Spanish martyr saints, with similar hagiographies of possibly same historical origin, with several locales in Roman Catholic countries named after them:
 Saint Eulalia of Mérida (c. 292–304)
 Saint Eulalia of Barcelona (c. 290–303) whose relics are assumed to be in the Barcelona Cathedral, La Catedral de la Santa Creu i Santa Eulàlia
 Eulalia (abbess of Shaftesbury), an abbess of Shaftesbury abbey in Dorset (England) 
 Eulalia Ares de Vildoza (1809–1884), Argentinian coup leader
 Eulalia de Liáns, pseudonym of Spanish writer Fanny Garrido (1846–1917)
 Eulalia Kadmina (1853–1881), Imperial Russian opera singer
 Eulàlia Lledó (born 1952), Spanish academic
 Infanta Eulalia of Spain (1864–1958)
 Princess Eulalia of Thurn and Taxis (1908-1993)

Places
 Santa Eulalia del Rio, the Spanish name for the town of Santa Eulària des Riu.
 Sainte-Eulalie, Quebec
 Sainte-Eulalie, Gironde in the Aquitaine region of France
 Sainte-Eulalie, Ardèche in the Rhône-Alpes region of France
 Eulalia Township, Potter County, Pennsylvania, USA
 Eulalia, Norman Park, a heritage-listed house in Brisbane, Queensland, Australia

Science
 495 Eulalia, an asteroid
 Eulalia (annelid), a genus of polychaete worms
 Eulalia, a synonym for the genus Odontomyia of flies
 Eulalia (plant), a genus of grasses named after Eulalie Delile
 Eulalia grass, the common name for the cultivated Miscanthus sinensis (syn. Eulalia japonica), a grass species
 Adelpha eulalia, a species of nymphalid butterfly

Fictional characters
 Eulalia Bon, a character in Absalom, Absalom! by William Faulkner
 A principal character in The Amours of Sainfroid and Eulalia

Literature
 Eulalia!, the 19th novel in the Redwall series by Brian Jacques
 Eulalie, the ladies' lingerie business run by itinerant dictator Roderick Spode in the works of P. G. Wodehouse
 Eulalie is song by Edgar Allan Poe

See also
 Eulalie (disambiguation)